OP Financial Group is one of the largest financial companies in Finland. It consists of 180 cooperative banks and their central organization. "OP" stands for "osuuspankki" in Finnish, literally meaning "cooperative bank". The financial group has over 2 million customer-owners, offering retail and commercial banking services all over Finland, as well as insurance services.

In 2014 the group acquired the remainder of the shares of Pohjola Bank and consolidated its services under the OP brand, shortening its name to OP from OP-Pohjola, a name it had used since 2007.

OP's current headquarters are located in Vallila, Helsinki, and opened in 2015.

History 
The company's predecessor was founded in 1891 when the fire insurance company Palovakuutus-Osakeyhtiö Pohjola commenced its operations. Pohjola Bank was listed on the Helsinki Stock Exchange in 1922, being one of the first companies to be listed in Helsinki.

The first local cooperative credit societies were founded in 1902 and received a large loan from the Finnish state the next year. The central organization for cooperatives was founded in 1928 as an ideological organization between local branches. As the business environment has changed and banking regulation has tightened, the central organization has increased its influence on local banks significantly.

In 2005 the central organization of OP Financial Group became a major shareholder of Pohjola Bank, which made the group the largest financial services group in Finland. The remainder of the shares were acquired in 2014.

Healthcare 
In 2014 OP announced plans to expand into the health and wellbeing market. It operated a hospital in the Helsinki region. In 2021 it cancelled the plan and sold the hospital.

OP Corporate Bank 

OP Corporate Bank Plc is the most significant subsidiary of OP Financial Group.

OP Corporate Bank's customers are large companies in Finland. It is responsible for the Baltic business, operating as a bank for large companies and conducting financial services in Estonia, Latvia and Lithuania. In addition, OP Corporate Bank offers financial services in internationalization. OP Corporate Bank also acts as the OP Financial Group's central bank.

Katja Keitaanniemi has been the President and CEO of OP Corporate Bank since 2018.

References

Banks of Finland
Financial services companies of Finland
Companies based in Helsinki
Banks established in 1902
1902 establishments in Finland
Cooperatives in Finland
Cooperative banking in Europe